2020 Belarusian Premier League Reserves Championship is the official reserve season football in Belarus. It will start in March and finish in November.

The league consists of Reserves sides matching those competing in the 2020 Belarusian Premier League.

League table

Results
Each team plays home-and-away once against every other team for a total of 30 matches played each.

References

External links
 

Belarusian Premier League Reserves Championship
4